The 2022 NCAA Division III Football Championship Game, more commonly referred to as the 2022 Stagg Bowl or Stagg Bowl XLIX, was a postseason college football played on December 16, 2022, at Navy–Marine Corps Memorial Stadium in Annapolis, Maryland. It determined a national champion in NCAA Division III for the 2022 season. The game began at 7:00 p.m. EST, and aired on ESPNU. The game will featured the two finalists of the 32-team single elimination playoff bracket, North Central and Mount Union; North Central won 28–21 to claim their second national championship.

Teams
The participants of the 2022 NCAA Division III Football Championship Game were the finalists of the 2022 Division III Playoffs, a 32-team single elimination brackets which began on November 19. The winners of each of the four 8-team regions qualified for the national semifinals.

National semifinals

Game summary

Statistics

References

Stagg Bowl
Mount Union Purple Raiders football
North Central Cardinals football
American football in Maryland
Stagg Bowl
Stagg Bowl